Zulfiqar Ahmad Dhillon (born October 2, 1948 in Addian village, Punjab) is a Pakistani politician and a retired Brigadier in the Pakistan Army. He is a son of Chaudry Laal Khan Dhillon and younger brother of Chaudry Nisar Ahmed Dhillon.

After retiring from the Army, Dhillon was a Pakistani Punjabi politician from Pakistan Muslim League (Q), and served as Provincial Minister Education for Punjab between 1997-1999.

Subsequently, he was elected as a Member of Pakistan National Assembly in the 2002 General Elections.

He graduated from Government College Lahore in 1959 with a Bsc. in Agriculture and then joined Pakistan Military Academy and was commissioned in 1962.

During his tenure in the Pakistan Army he attended Command and Staff College, Quetta from 1972 to 1974.

References

External links
PML (Q) Election Candidates

1948 births
2009 deaths
Pakistan Muslim League (Q) politicians
Pakistan Army officers
Pakistan Military Academy alumni
Government College University, Lahore alumni